

Premiership Honours

Premierships

Runners-up
The Knights have never lost a grand final.

Minor Premierships

The Knights have never came first in a season.

World Club Challenges

Finals
The Knights qualified for the NSWRL/ARL/NRL finals in the following years. 
1992, 1995, 1997, 1998, 1999, 2000, 2001, 2002, 2003, 2006, 2009, 2011, 2013, 2020, 2021

Youth Honours

NSW Cup
Premiers:
1995, 2015

Runners-up:
2014

NRL National Championship
Runners-up:
2015

S. G. Ball Cup Honours
Premiers:
1990, 2001, 2004, 2011

Harold Matthews Cup
Premiers:
1992, 2000, 2014, 2017, 2019

National Youth Competition
Minor Premiers:
2014

Jersey Flegg Cup Honours
Premiers:
1991, 1992

Minor Premiers:
2006

Runners-up:
2006

Jim Beam Cup
Premiers:
2003 (The Entrance Tigers), 2007 (The Entrance Tigers)

Runners-up:
2004 (The Entrance Tigers)

Individual Honours

Rothmans Medal Winners:
 Mark Sargent (1989)

Dally M Medal Winners:
 Andrew Johns (1998, 1999, 2002)
 Danny Buderus (2004)

Clive Churchill Medal Winners:
 Robbie O'Davis (1997)
 Andrew Johns (2001)

References

Honours
Rugby league trophies and awards
National Rugby League lists